Mongolia competed at the 2012 Winter Youth Olympics in Innsbruck, Austria. The Mongolian team consisted of two athletes in two different sports.

Cross country skiing

Mongolia qualified one boy cross-country skier.

Boy

Sprint

Speed skating

Mongolia qualified one female athlete.

Girl

See also
Mongolia at the 2012 Summer Olympics

References

2012 in Mongolian sport
Nations at the 2012 Winter Youth Olympics
Mongolia at the Youth Olympics